The Lot is an American comedy-drama series that aired for two seasons and 17 episodes on the AMC from 1999 to 2001. It profiled the fictional studio Sylver Screen Pictures during the 1930s and the pursuits of its classic stars (such as Barbara Stanwyck, Greta Garbo and Shirley Temple). The show was met with neither popular nor critical success but Jeffrey Tambor, Rue McClanahan, Linda Cardellini and Michael York all had notable recurring roles.

The two seasons had two different plotlines. The first season (four episodes) detailed the rise and fall of young starlet June Parker (Linda Cardellini). Cardellini left to star in Freaks and Geeks, forcing a premature end to the first season. The second season (thirteen episodes) revolved around a new main character.

Cast
Sara Botsford as Norma St. Claire
Allen Garfield as Harry Sylver (season 1)
Linda Cardellini as June Parker (season 1)
Steven Petrarca as Charlie Patterson 
Stephanie Faracy as Mary Parker
Francois Giroday as Fabian
Holland Taylor as Letitia DeVine
Perry Stephens as Jack Sweeney
Jonathan Frakes as Roland White

Episodes

Season 1 (1999)

Season 2 (2001)

Historical references
The characters of Priscilla Tremaine (Rue McClanahan) and Letitia DeVine (Holland Taylor) were based on gossip columnists Hedda Hopper and Louella Parsons, respectively. A running end-credits gag had Letitia DeVine reporting ironic news items about period stars on her radio show, then insulting them sotto voce when the broadcast was over. Roland White (Jonathan Frakes) is based on millionaire aeronautical engineer and movie mogul Howard Hughes, who was known for his relationships with pretty redheaded Hollywood starlets.

A movie being made by Sylver Studios refers to The Moon Is Blue, a movie famously censored for having Maggie McNamara say the word "virgin" in one of her lines.

Sylver Studios was a stand-in for Samuel Goldwyn Productions. The title The Lot also refers to the famed Pickford-Fairbanks Studios lot in Hollywood, California, which rented out production space to multiple film studios.

Awards and nominations
Casting Society of America:
Nominated: Best Casting for TV, Comedy Episodic: Deborah Barylski, Pat McCorkle

Costume Designers Guild Awards:
Nominated: Excellence in Costume Design for Television - Period/Fantasy: Jean Pierre Dorléac

Emmy Awards:

2001:

Won: Outstanding Costumes for a Series: Gilberto Mello, Jean-Pierre Dorléac for episode "Mob Scene"

Nominated: Outstanding Guest Actor in a Comedy Series: Michael York for episode "Daddy Dearest" and "Stiffed"

Nominated: Outstanding Hairstyling for a Series: Cheri Ruff, Carl Bailey, Stephen Elsbree for episode "Daddy Dearest"

2000:

Nominated: Outstanding Guest Actress in a Comedy Series: Holland Taylor for playing Letitia Devine.

References

External links

1999 American television series debuts
2001 American television series endings
English-language television shows
1990s American comedy-drama television series
2000s American comedy-drama television series
AMC (TV channel) original programming
Television series set in the 1930s
Television shows set in Los Angeles